Hajjiabad (also Romanized as Ḩājjīābād) is a village in Katul Rural District, in the Central District of Aliabad County, Golestan Province, Iran. At the 2006 census, its population was 364, in 91 families.

References 

Populated places in Aliabad County